Belisana ratnapura is a species of spider of the genus Belisana. It is endemic to Sri Lanka.

See also
 List of Pholcidae species

References

Pholcidae
Endemic fauna of Sri Lanka
Spiders of Asia
Spiders described in 2005